Local elections were held in Indonesia on 15 February 2017, with a single run-off for Jakarta on 19 April 2017. The series of elections was the second time local elections were held simultaneously across the country after the 2015 local elections. In total, the election contested 7 gubernatorial, 18 mayoral and 76 regent seats with 41 million eligible voters and 337 candidate pairs.

Like other local elections in Indonesia (except for Jakarta), the elections followed a simple majority, first-past-the-post system where the candidates with the most votes automatically wins the seat even if they have less than 50% of the votes.

Background
Following the fall of Suharto and the Indonesian transition to democracy, local elections began taking place allowing citizens to directly vote for leaders of local subdivisions in June 2005, which had previously been elected through a closed vote by the local legislative councils (/DPRD). These elections were held separately for both provincial and municipal (cities and regencies) levels, resulting in on average an election every 3 days across the country according to the director-general of regional autonomy Djohermansyah Djohan. Between June 2005 and 2013, around 1,000 such elections were held prompting the discussion of a single simultaneous election to save costs.

Simultaneous local elections (Pilkada Serentak) were first held in Indonesia on 2015. Future plans for the elections included ones in 2017, 2018 and 2020, with appointed central government officials taking office instead for 2022 and 2023. It was planned that by 2024 the local executive elections could be held simultaneously with the presidential and legislative elections.

Schedule
Registration for candidates were separated into tickets supported by political parties and independent candidates who were required to prove popular support by submitting copies of ID cards, the quantity of which ranged from 6.5 to 10 percent of the area's number of eligible voters depending on the local population in accordance to Law No. 8 of 2015. The latter were required to register to the General Elections Commission between 6 and 10 August 2016. Tickets backed by a political party or a coalition of such required the parties to have the cumulative support of either 20 percent of DPRD seats or 25 percent of the popular vote in the 2014 legislative election, and were to register between 19 and 21 September 2016. After a verification process, official candidates were announced on 24 October 2016 and the ballot numbers were given out on the following day. The campaigning period commenced on 28 October and continued until 11 February the following year. A three-day election silence followed, and the votes were cast on 15 February.

After the wave of elections, the votes were recapitulated and counted. Official announcement of the results were done between 8 and 10 March 2017, and the winners given official status by the Constitutional Court subject to disputes. For the case of Jakarta, a majority vote was required to win the election, which was not obtained from the 15 February vote and required a run-off on 19 April. The results of Jakarta's run-off was announced on 30 April.

According to data by the Ministry of Home Affairs, the elections used up Rp 7 trillion (US$520 million). Minister Tjahjo Kumolo stated that the elections were less efficient and required more funding than the previous system of individual elections.

Elections

Gubernatorial

Note: name in italics indicate incumbents who ran for re-election

Mayoral

Regent

References

 
2017 elections in Indonesia
2017
Indonesia politics-related lists